According to a disability charity organization Light of the World, there are around 250,000 people with disabilities in South Sudan. In 2015, South Sudan passed a pro-disabled law. An umbrella organisation, the National Union of Disabled Peoples Organisations, made up of eight constituent organisations including the South Sudan Women with Disabilities Network and the South Sudan National Association for the Deaf, was established in September 2020 to advocate for the rights and interests of disabled South Sudanese.

References

External links
 

Disability in South Sudan
Disability in Africa